Krampus Unleashed is a 2016 horror film written and directed by Robert Conway. Premiering on video on demand before being released direct-to-video, the film stars Bryson Holl, Caroline Lassetter, Tim Sauer, and Emily Lynne Aiken as members of a dysfunctional family who run afoul of the mythological creature Krampus (Travis Amery) while spending Christmas with relatives in the Southwestern United States.

Plot 
In 1898, a German outlaw named Erik Klaus allegedly buried treasure somewhere in the Arizona desert before disappearing, leaving behind an ominous warning to anyone who went looking for his stash. Years later, a group of cowboys discovers the loot, which turns out to be a coal-like "summoning stone" that releases Krampus when exposed to open flames. According to myth, Saint Nicholas left pieces of the stone in the shoes and stockings of his enemies, so that Krampus would kill them when the clothing was placed by a fire to dry. Krampus is accidentally summoned when the stone is dropped on a lantern, and it proceeds to massacre all of the cowboys save one, Cooper. While Cooper flees, the summoning stone falls into a stream, and is lost.

Decades later, a family consisting of Will and Amber, and their children Tommy and Fiona, travels to Arizona to spend Christmas with Amber's parents, Dale and Alice Henderson. Amber hasn't seen her parents in a long time, so she's excited for the reunion. Also present are Amber's environmentalist brother, David, his wife, Vivian, and their delinquent son, Troy. While gold panning in a creek near the house, Tommy finds the summoning stone, which brings forth Krampus when Troy accidentally burns it with a lit cigarette. Krampus runs amok through the area, murdering a pair of Bigfoot hunters, as well as the boyfriend of a woman named Bonnie who lives nearby. Bonnie seeks aid from the Hendersons and uses their telephone to call 911.

As they wait for the police to arrive, Will, Dale, Alice and Amber are all slaughtered by Krampus. David, Vivian, Fiona, Troy, Tommy and Bonnie try to flee in a car, but it crashes, killing Vivian. David attacks Krampus to buy the others time to run away and is ripped to pieces. Bonnie, Fiona, Troy and Tommy make it to Cooper's trail who has spent his life studying Krampus ever since he survived it all those years ago. Cooper reveals that Krampus is summoned by fire, but can be banished back to Hell by earth.

Cooper, Bonnie, Fiona, Troy and Tommy lure Krampus into an abandoned mine shaft with the summoning stone, and Cooper sacrifices himself to collapse the cavern on Krampus with TNT while the others escape. In the morning, Bonnie, Tommy and Fiona and are found by Bonnie's ex-boyfriend, a state trooper named Dan. Troy, who had become separated from the others, is mauled by a baby Krampus that had hatched from the summoning stone.

Cast

Release 
Krampus Unleashed premiered on video on demand on November 1, 2016 and was released on DVD by Uncork'd Entertainment on December 3, 2016. It was made available on the streaming service Hulu in December 2018.

Reception 
Scott Foy of Dread Central, who awarded Krampus Unleashed a score of 1½ out of a possible 5, commended the film's creature design and gore effects, but heavily criticized every other aspect of it, writing, "When your movie is only 75 minutes but feels longer because so little happens for so long, that will definitely get you on my naughty list." While fellow Dread Central reviewer Ted Hentschke was slightly more lenient towards the film, giving it a grade of 2/5, he still derided it as being "uninteresting" and "bland" and concluded, "It wasn't good enough to want to love, and wasn't shit enough to make me hate it." Chris Coffel of Film School Rejects wrote, "This is the second Krampus movie on this list from director Robert Conway (Krampus: The Reckoning). You would think if one director was going to make two different Krampus movies that Krampus would have the same mythos, but that is not the case. This film does offer up some practical effects with the creature which makes it far better than Conway's previous film. It's still not good at all, but I'll take the slight improvement as a step in the right direction." Nolen Boe of Horror News opined that the film's gore effects were its only positive quality, and dismissively stated, "Krampus Unleashed was not entertaining, in any way worth my money as a consumer." A score of 3/10 was awarded to the film by Starburst's Scott Clark, who wrote, "Sure it's better than Conway's first Krampus flick, but that's not saying much. The dialogue feels clunky and overdone, the acting is passable yet never involving, and worst perhaps is that its plain old dull" before concluding, "There's potential here for a good horror comedy (rednecks mistake Krampus prints for Bigfoot) but Conway takes things too seriously and spends too much time acquainting us with Krampus fodder families. Krampus: Unleashed feels most comfortable when its offing terrible people with terrible violence, we just wish it did that more."

See also 
 List of Christmas films
 Krampus: The Reckoning, another Krampus film directed by Robert Conway

References

External links 
 
 

2016 direct-to-video films
2016 films
2016 horror films
2010s Christmas horror films
2010s exploitation films
2016 fantasy films
2016 independent films
2010s monster movies
2010s supernatural films
Abandoned buildings and structures in fiction
American direct-to-video films
American exploitation films
American dark fantasy films
American independent films
American monster movies
American splatter films
American supernatural horror films
American Christmas horror films
Demons in film
Direct-to-video fantasy films
Direct-to-video horror films
2010s English-language films
Films about dysfunctional families
Films about mass murder
Films based on European myths and legends
Films about hunters
Films set in 2016
Films set in Arizona
Films set in deserts
Krampus in film
Films about mining
Supernatural fantasy films
Treasure hunt films
Films directed by Robert Conway
2010s American films